The 4th & Vine Tower (formerly known as the Union Central Tower and Central Trust Bank Building) is a  skyscraper in downtown Cincinnati, Ohio. It stands 31 stories tall, overlooking the Ohio River waterfront. It is easily one of the most recognizable buildings in the city's skyline, owing to the elaborate Hellenic architecture in the upper portion of the tower, which was modeled to resemble reconstructions of the Mausoleum at Halicarnassus. Few PNC Bank employees now work in the 4th & Vine Tower today, as most report to the newer PNC Center. PNC Bank has the signage rights to the building, but PNC Tower is not the official name. It is officially the 4th & Vine Tower. The signage on the building was "Central Trust" until sometime after the Scripps Building was completed in 1990.

History
The site of the tower was previously occupied by the U.S. Post Office and Customs House and also at a later time by the Chamber of Commerce Building.

The 4th & Vine Tower was originally built as the headquarters for The Union Central Life Insurance Company, which moved out in 1964. At least four people died during the construction. When construction of the Cass Gilbert-designed building was completed in 1913, the Union Central Tower was the fifth-tallest building in the world and the 2nd tallest building (tallest office building) outside of New York City.  The building opened May 1, with final construction costs of approximately $3 million. It remained the tallest building in Cincinnati until 1930, when construction on the Carew Tower was completed.

The building, along with the nearby skyscraper, the Carew Tower, was featured in the opening and closing of the daytime drama The Edge of Night from 1967 to 1980.  Cincinnati had stood in as the show's locale, Monticello; the company that produced Edge, soap and consumer products maker Procter & Gamble, is based in Cincinnati. It was also featured in the opening and closing credits of the TV sitcom WKRP in Cincinnati, although the show was produced in Hollywood.

In March 2021, the structure was announced to be the new home of 250 apartments, office spaces, and a 'city within a city' concept by The Port Authority of Cincinnati and Hamilton County. The construction is reported to begin within six months.

See also
List of tallest buildings in Cincinnati

References

Skyscraper office buildings in Cincinnati
Office buildings completed in 1913
Bank company headquarters in the United States
Cass Gilbert buildings
Neoclassical architecture in Ohio
1913 establishments in Ohio